The 2010–11 Championship season sees Millwall playing back in the second tier of English football, after a four-year absence. They secured promotion from League One via the Play-offs. This is Millwall's 85th season in the Football League and 36th in the second tier.

Squad
As of 7 May 2011.

No longer at Millwall

Results

Results by round

League table

Championship

August

September

October

November

December

January

February

March

April

May

League Cup

First round

Second round

Third round

FA Cup

Third round

References

External links
Official Website

2010-11
Millwall
Millwall Fc Season, 2010-11
Millwall United Fc Season, 2010-11